Raymundo Díaz Mendoza Jr. (born March 22, 1960) is a Mexican professional wrestler, who has performed under the name Villano V (Villano Quinto, which means "Fifth Villain") until he was unmasked on March 20, 2009, after which he became known as "Ray Mendoza Jr." after his father Ray Mendoza. Mendoza is part of a well-known Mexican wrestling family that includes four other Villanos, I, II, III and IV. Since making his debut in 1975 Mendoza has wrestled for every major Mexican wrestling federation including Universal Wrestling Association, AAA and Consejo Mundial de Lucha Libre. He also worked for the United States-based World Championship Wrestling (WCW) as enhancement talent, usually appearing on secondary shows like WCW Saturday Night.

Professional wrestling career

Early career (1976–1983)
Raymundo Mendoza Jr. is the son of Ray Mendoza, a well known Mexican wrestler and wrestling trainer and the brother of Villano I (José de Jesús Díaz Mendoza), Villano II (José Alfredo Díaz Mendoza), Villano III (Arturo Díaz Mendoza), and Villano IV (Thomas Mendoza). Trained by his father and oldest brother, he was not allowed to use the Villano name until he finished his education. Because his younger brother finished his degree faster than Raymundo Mendoza Jr., he is known as "V" or 5 even though he is the fourth son of Ray Mendoza. In May 1976, Raymundo Mendoza Jr. made his professional wrestling debut using the name "Rokambole" (originally used by his older brother Arturo before he became Villano III). Mendoza worked for several years under this name, gaining experience without the pressure of the Villano Name.

Mexican promotions (1983–1996) 
In September 1983 Raymundo Mendoza Jr. finally took the mask and the name of his brothers and became Villano V. He immediately began teaming with his brothers, especially Villano I and Villano IV and engaged in a heated and very popular feud with the trios team of Los Brazos (Brazo de Plata, Brazo de Oro and El Brazo). On October 21, 1988, Villano I, IV, and V defeated Los Brazos in a Mask vs. Mask match and thus unmasked Los Brazos. Over the years Villano V and his brothers have worked for Universal Wrestling Association (UWA), AAA and Consejo Mundial de Lucha Libre (CMLL) and with shorter runs with International Wrestling Revolution Group (IWRG) and World Wrestling Association holding tag team and Trios titles in all federations.

World Championship Wrestling (1996–2000) 
Villano IV and V began working for World Championship Wrestling (WCW) as part of the influx of Luchadors in 1996. Villano V made his debut at the 1996 World War 3 event as part of the Three Ring, 60 man battle royal. Subsequently, Los Villanos worked mainly the weekend shows such as WCW World Wide and WCW Saturday Night. The brothers played the role of a heel and would occasionally cheat by switching places while the referee was distracted (all Villanos wore identical attire, aside from their Roman numeral distinctions). Los Villanos made a couple of appearances on WCW's main shows and PPVs such as Villano IV teaming with Konnan and La Parka to defeat Juventud Guerrera, Ciclope and Super Calo at SuperBrawl VII. They also worked an eight-man tag match at Clash of the Champions XXXV, alongside Psychosis and Silver King against Juventud Guerrera, Super Calo, Héctor Garza and Lizmark Jr. While working in WCW Villano IV suffered a neck injury as a result of a failed move by Kanyon and Raven. The injury threatened to force Villano IV into retirement but he was able to recover and was back teaming with Villano V in WCW in 2000.

Mexican promotions (2000–present) 
At the CMLL 75th Anniversary Show on September 19, 2008, Villano V defeated longtime rival Blue Panther in a Mask vs. Mask match to unmask Panther after 30 years of wearing the mask. The ending was very popular with the vocal crowd at Arena Mexico prompting them to throw cash into the ring (a tradition in Mexico after a great match). On March 20, 2009, Villano V lost a mask vs. mask match against Último Guerrero on the Homenaje a Dos Leyendas show and was forced to unmask and reveal his real name as per Lucha Libre traditions. Since losing his mask Villano V regularly wrestles under the ring name "Ray Mendoza Jr." in honor of his father. His brother Villano IV had also wrestled under the name Ray Mendoza Jr. briefly in WCW many years before. He, along with his brothers Villano III and Villano IV were on hand for the 2010 Homenaje a Dos Leyendas show where CMLL honored their father Ray Mendoza with an in-ring ceremony. On September 20, 2012, Mendoza Jr. made his debut for the Japanese Wrestling New Classic (WNC) promotion, when he was defeated by Dave Finlay in the main event at Tokyo's Korakuen Hall. Two days later in Osaka, Mendoza Jr. defeated Tajiri in another main event.

Mendoza announced that he would be retiring in early 2013, with a show on March 16, 2013, as his last wrestling appearance. The main event of the show was a Ruleta de la Muerta tag team tournament, where the losing teams advance instead of the winners and the team that loses in the main event would have to wrestle against each other to determine who would unmask. The teams for the Ruleta de la Muerta were announced as Ray Mendoza Jr. and Villano IV, El Mesias and Mil Mascaras, Máscara Año 2000 and Rayo de Jalisco Jr., Casandro and Hijo de Pirata Morgan, Cien Caras and Dr. Wagner Jr., L.A. Park and Universo 2000, and El Solar and Toscano. The Villano duo lost to Mil Máscaras and El Mesias in the first round and lost to El Texano Jr. and Super Nova in the second round qualifying them for the finals where the losing team would be forced to either unmask (Villano IV) or have their hair shaved off (Mendoza Jr.). The team faced, and defeated the team of Hijo de Pirata Morgan and Cassandro which meant Hijo de Pirata Morgan had to unmask and reveal his birthname, Antheus Ortiz Chávez, while Cassandro had all his hair shaved off as is traditional with Luchas de Apuestas losses. The undercard featured a match with Ray Mendoza Jr.'s sons Kaving and Kortiz, teaming with Dr. Cerebro and Cerebro Negro losing to the team of Eita, Fénix, Freelance, and Mike Segura. On March 21, 2013, only 4 days after his official retirement show Ray Mendoza Jr. was announced as working on CMLL's Arena Coliseo 70th Anniversary Show on April 7, claiming that due to poor attendance for his retirement show he personally lost $38,000 promoting the show and thus was forced to return to wrestling to make that money back. On June 16, Mendoza returned to AAA at Triplemanía XXI, challenging El Texano Jr. to a future match for the AAA Mega Championship.

Personal life
Raymundo Mendoza Jr. is the fourth son and seventh child over all of José Díaz Velazquez and Lupita Mendoza. His brothers, like himself all became wrestlers: José de Jesús (Villano I), José Alfredo (Villano II), Arturo (Villano III), Raymundo Jr., and Tomás (Villano IV). Lupita Mendoza died in 1986, his second oldest brother José Alfredo died in 1989, his oldest brother José de Jesús died in 2001 and his father José Diaz died on April 16, 2003. Díaz was adamant that his sons get a good education instead of becoming wrestlers, wishing that they become lawyers or doctors as he wanted to spare them the physical suffering he experienced himself. Once he realized that his two oldest sons had begun wrestling under masks he agreed to train them and help their wrestling careers. He was also instrumental in training his youngest two sons, although he insisted they both get college degrees before they were allowed to begin wrestling. Since his youngest son Tomás finished his education first he became known as "Villano IV" while Raymundo, the second youngest son, became "Villano V". Mendoza has two sons, who are also professional wrestlers, the two began their careers under as the masked characters Kortiz, and Kaving. Mendoza's nephews (sons of Arturo Mendoza) wrestle as Villano III Jr. and El Hijo del Villano III. On June 6, 2017 Mendoza introduced Villano V Jr., his oldest son who had worked as "Kaving" up until that point, to the public after the young luchador was officially licensed under the name and presented him with the distinctive Villano mask.

Championships and accomplishments
Asistencia Asesoría y Administración / AAA
AAA Americas Trios Championship (2 times) – with Villano III and Villano IV
Mexican National Atómicos Championship (1 time) – with Villano III, Villano IV and Pierroth Jr.
International Wrestling Revolution Group (Grupo Internacional Revolucion)
IWRG Intercontinental Trios Championship (1 time) – with Villano III and Villano IV
Copa Higher Power (2003)
Pro Wrestling Illustrated
PWI ranked him # 112 of the 500 best singles wrestlers of the PWI 500 in 1998.
Universal Wrestling Association
UWA World Light Heavyweight Championship (2 times)
UWA World Tag Team Championship (3 times) – with Villano IV
UWA World Trios Championship (5 times) – with Villano I and Villano IV (4), Scorpio Jr. and Shu El Guerrero (1)
Universal Wrestling Entertainment
UWE Tag Team Championship (1 time, current) – with Villano IV
World Wrestling Association
WWA World Tag Team Championship (1 time) – with Villano IV
WWA World Trios Championship (1 time) – with Villano III and Villano IV
Wrestling Observer Newsletter
Worst Match of the Year (2015) with Villano III and Villano IV vs. Monster Clown, Murder Clown and Psycho Clown on August 9

Luchas de Apuestas record

References

External links 

 
 

1962 births
The Latino World Order members
Living people
Masked wrestlers
Mexican male professional wrestlers
Professional wrestlers from Mexico City
20th-century professional wrestlers
21st-century professional wrestlers
Mexican National Atómicos Champions
UWA World Trios Champions
UWA World Tag Team Champions
UWA World Light Heavyweight Champions